Action for a Change. A Student's Manual for Public Interest Organizing is a 1971 book written by consumer advocate Ralph Nader with Donald K. Ross, Brett English, and Joseph Highland. The book serves as a manual for college students establishing Public Interest Research Groups (PIRGs), and chronicles the formation of PIRGs in Oregon and Minnesota.

References

1971 non-fiction books
English-language books
Books about politics of the United States
Works by Ralph Nader
Works about community organizing